The Embassy of India in Kathmandu is the diplomatic mission of the Republic of India to Nepal.

Ambassador

Cultural center

Swami Vivekananda Cultural Centre
Embassy operates ICCR's Swami Vivekananda Cultural Centre in Kathmandu. It was established in 2008 to promote cultural ties between India and Nepal.

B. P. Koirala India - Nepal Foundation
B. P. Koirala India - Nepal Foundation (BPKF) is affiliated with the Indian Embassy in Kathmandu. It was established in 1991 in the memory of B. P. Koirala to promote cultural exchange between India and Nepal. Foundation office is located inside the Embassy of India.

Nepal Bharat Library

Nepal Bharat Library or more generally called the Indian Library is run by the Indian Embassy in Kathmandu, Nepal. The library was called Nepal-Bharat Sanskritik Kendra  till 2005. The library was established in 1951 after India set up the diplomatic relation with Nepal (13 June 1947) with an aim to enhance and strengthen cultural relations and information exchange between India and Nepal. It is the first foreign library in Nepal.

See also
 Nepal–India relations
 Foreign relations of India
 Foreign relations of Nepal
 List of diplomatic missions in Nepal
 List of diplomatic missions of India

References

External links
Official website

Diplomatic missions of India
Diplomatic missions in Kathmandu
Diplomatic missions in Nepal
India–Nepal relations